Olga Safronova may refer to:

  Olga Safronova (sprinter) (born 1991), Kazakhstani sprinter
  Olga Safronova (equestrian) (born 1992), Belarusian dressage rider